Aga Syed Mehdi (19 February 1959 – 3 November 2000) was a prominent Kashmiri Shia leader and social activist. He was son of Aga Syed Mustafa Moosavi. He was assassinated in an IED blast on Friday 3 November 2000.

Life and education 
Aga Syed Mehdi was born in Budgam, Kashmir into the prominent Aga family. He studied at Baab-ul-Ilm and subsequently received Maulawi Fazil from Jamia Bab-ul-Ilm, Budgam. He joined Anjuman E Sharie Shian as a member by the age of 22. He rose into prominence among the people for his philanthropic works. Later he joined Indian National Congress and participated in MP elections in 1998. During the time of 1990's Kashmir insurgency, Shaheed Aga Syed Mehdi rescued many innocent youth from interrogation centers and army camps detained during crackdowns by Task Force and military.

Assassination and aftermath 
On 3 November 2000, Aga Syed Mehdi was assassinated in a powerful IED blast on the way to Magam along with his three security personnel and two supporters at Kanihama-Magam road, Central Budgam. The blast was so powerful the bullet-proof gypsy was ripped apart and blew occupants into pieces. The news of his assassination spread rapidly, the government of Jammu and Kashmir imposed curfew and section 144 crpc still hundreds and thousands joined his funeral including mainstream and majority of separatist leaders . During his funeral Kashmiri pandit women of Budgam were heard crying "Bayo asi kus kari raech wain" meaning "Brother who will protect us now."  Shaheed Aga Syed Mehdi was laid to rest at Sarkaar's Shrine Budgam or Aga Sahib Shrine.

References 

1959 births
2000 deaths
People from Budgam district
Kashmiri people